Kavalgeri is a village in Dharwad district of Karnataka, India.

Demographics 
As of the 2011 Census of India there were 450 households in Kavalgeri and a total population of 2,137 consisting of 1,128 males and 1,009 females. There were 284 children ages 0-6.

References

Villages in Dharwad district